Dendroconus is a subgenus  of sea snails, marine gastropod mollusks in the genus Conus, family Conidae, the cone snails and their allies.

In the new classification of the family Conidae by Puillandre N., Duda T.F., Meyer C., Olivera B.M. & Bouchet P. (2015), Dendroconus has become a subgenus of Conus: Conus (Dendroconus) Tucker & Tenorio, 2013 represented as Conus Linnaeus, 1758

Distinguishing characteristics
The Tucker & Tenorio 2009 taxonomy distinguishes Dendroconus from Conus in the following ways:

 Genus Conus Linnaeus, 1758
 Shell characters (living and fossil species)
The basic shell shape is conical to elongated conical, has a deep anal notch on the shoulder, a smooth periostracum and a small operculum. The shoulder of the shell is usually nodulose and the protoconch is usually multispiral. Markings often include the presence of tents except for black or white color variants, with the absence of spiral lines of minute tents and textile bars.
Radular tooth (not known for fossil species)
The radula has an elongated anterior section with serrations and a large exposed terminating cusp, a non-obvious waist, blade is either small or absent and has a short barb, and lacks a basal spur.
Geographical distribution
These species are found in the Indo-Pacific region.
Feeding habits
These species eat other gastropods including cones.

 Subgenus Dendroconus Swainson, 1840
Shell characters (living and fossil species)
The shell is large, thick, and turgid to conical in shape.  The protoconch is multispiral and nodules are either absent or die out in later whorls.  The shoulders are rounded and the shell is ornamented with cords which become numerous and very small in the outer whorls.  The anal notch is shallow.  The periostracum may be smooth but is often thick and ridged, and the operculum is small.
Radular tooth (not known for fossil species)
The anterior section of the radula is equal to or slightly longer than the posterior section.  The blade is fairly long and covers at least half the length of the anterior section of the radular tooth.  A basal spur is present, and the barb is short.  The radular tooth has serrations and the terminating cusp is exposed along the shaft.
Geographical distribution
These species are found in the Indo-Pacific region.
Feeding habits
These species are vermivorous (meaning that they prey on marine worms).

Species list
This list of species is based on the information in the World Register of Marine Species (WoRMS) list. Species within the genus Dendroconus include:

 Dendroconus betulinus (Linnaeus, 1758): synonym of  Conus betulinus Linnaeus, 1758
 Dendroconus biliosus (Röding, 1798: synonym of Conus biliosus (Röding, 1798)
 Dendroconus buxeus (Röding, 1798): synonym of  Conus buxeus (Röding, 1798)
 Dendroconus figulinus (Linnaeus, 1758): synonym of  Conus figulinus Linnaeus, 1758
 Dendroconus glaucus (Linnaeus, 1758): synonym of  Conus glaucus Linnaeus, 1758
 Dendroconus medoci (Lorenz, 2004): synonym of  Conus medoci Lorenz, 2004
 Dendroconus neoroseus da Motta, 1993: synonym of Conus biliosus (Röding, 1798)
 Dendroconus royaikeni Veldsman, 2010: synonym of Conus royaikeni (S. G. Veldsman, 2010)
 Dendroconus suratensis (Hwass in Bruguière, 1792): synonym of  Conus suratensis Hwass in Bruguière, 1792

References

Further reading 
 Kohn A. A. (1992). Chronological Taxonomy of Conus, 1758-1840". Smithsonian Institution Press, Washington and London.
 Monteiro A. (ed.) (2007). The Cone Collector 1: 1-28.
 Berschauer D. (2010). Technology and the Fall of the Mono-Generic Family The Cone Collector 15: pp. 51-54
 Puillandre N., Meyer C.P., Bouchet P., and Olivera B.M. (2011), Genetic divergence and geographical variation in the deep-water Conus orbignyi complex (Mollusca: Conoidea)'', Zoologica Scripta 40(4) 350-363.

External links
 To World Register of Marine Species
  Gastropods.com: Conidae setting forth the genera recognized therein.

Conidae
Gastropod subgenera